Puya weberbaueri is a species in the genus Puya. This species is native to Bolivia and Peru.

References

weberbaueri
Flora of Bolivia